Tan-Tan is a city in Tan-Tan Province in the region of Guelmim-Oued Noun in southwestern Morocco. It is a desert town with a population (2014 census) of 73,209. It is the largest city in the province and second largest city in the region after the capital Guelmim. The town also has an airport, Tan Tan Plage Blanche Airport.

History

The quartz figurine Venus of Tan-Tan was found in a river terrace deposit on the north bank of the Draa River. Dated between 200,000 and 500,000 BCE, it is considered one of the oldest human-form sculptures in the world, although its formation may actually be natural.

Port
With a population in 2004 of 6,294 it is the second-largest settlement in the province and ninth-largest in the region. Both Tan-Tan and Tan-Tan Plage are on Morocco's main highway, the N1.

Climate
Tan-Tan has a hot desert climate (Köppen climate classification BWh).

See also 
 Tan-Tan Moussem

References

External links

 Entry in Lexicorient

Populated places in Tan-Tan Province
Municipalities of Morocco
Provincial capitals in Morocco